Abhirami Pattar born Subramaniya Iyer was a Hindu saint from the south Indian state of Tamil Nadu. He is famed as the author of a collection of hymns called Abhirami Anthadhi which is widely regarded as one of the foremost works of modern Tamil literature.

Etymology 

Abhirami (Lit. She who is attractive at every moment of time) refers to the Goddess Abirami. Pattar is the Tamil word for 'One who worships or The Priest of.'

Early life 
Subramaniya Iyer was born to Amirthalinga Iyer in the village of Thirukadaiyur. Thirukkadaiyur has one of elegant Brahmin quarters near the temple called as agraharams established by the Maratha ruler Serfoji I, a great admirer of Brahmin poets and bards, in the early part of the 18th century. The village was famous for its Shiva temple, called Amritaghateswarar-Abirami Temple, Thirukkadaiyur. Right from his childhood, Subramaniya Iyer was drawn to the temple and the Goddess.

One day, the King visited the temple to pay homage to Lord Shiva. On noticing the peculiar behaviour of Subramaniya Iyer who was a temple priest, he inquired the other priests about the individual. One of them remarked that he was a madman while another rejected this categorization explaining to the king that Subramaniya Iyer was only an ardent devotee of Goddess Abhirami. Seeking to know the truth himself, Serfoji approached the priest and asked him what day of the month it was i.e. whether it was a full-moon day or a new-moon day. Subramaniya Iyer who could see nothing else but the shining luminant form of the Goddess before him wrongly answered that it was a full-moon day while it was in fact a new-moon day. The king rode off informing the former that he would have his head cut off if the moon did not appear on the sky by six in the night.

Immediately realizing his mistake, Subramaniya Iyer supposedly lit a huge fire and erected a platform over it supported by a hundred ropes. He sat upon the platform and prayed to the Goddess Abhirami to save him. He cut off one rope after another in succession on completion of each verse of his prayer. These hymns form the Abhirami Anthadhi. On completion of the 79th hymn, the Goddess Abhirami manifested herself before him and threw her earring over the sky such that it shone with bright light upon the horizon. The area around the temple sparkled with bright light. Overcome with ecstasy, Subramaniya Iyer composed 21 more verses in praise of the Goddess.

The king repented his mistake and immediately cancelled the punishment he had awarded Subramaniya Iyer. He also bestowed upon the latter the title of Abirami Pattar or "priest of Goddess Abhirami".

Devotion to Goddess Abirami 
As he grew, Iyer developed devotion to goddess Abirami. He would sit in a corner of the temple meditating upon the Goddess and singing her praises. As time passed, he was forever immersed in meditation upon the Goddess that he began to observe the supposed likeliness of the Goddess in the person of the women around him and often showered them with flowers.

References

External links 
  Abirami Anthathi easy explanation in Tamil  
 Text of the Abirami Anthadhi from Project Madurai

Indian Hindu saints
18th-century Hindu religious leaders
19th-century Hindu religious leaders
18th-century births
Year of birth uncertain
Year of death unknown
People from Mayiladuthurai district
Scholars from Tamil Nadu
Shaktas